Joseph Holt (January 6, 1807 – August 1, 1894) was an American lawyer, soldier, and politician. As a leading member of the Buchanan administration, he succeeded in convincing Buchanan to oppose the secession of the South. He returned to Kentucky and successfully battled the secessionist element thereby helping to keep Kentucky in the Union. President Abraham Lincoln appointed him the  Judge Advocate General of the United States Army. He served as Lincoln's chief arbiter and enforcer of military law, and supporter of emancipation. His most famous roles came in the Lincoln assassination trials.

Early life
Joseph Holt was born in Breckinridge County, Kentucky, on January 6, 1807. He was educated at St. Joseph's College in Bardstown, Kentucky and Centre College in Danville, Kentucky. He settled in Elizabethtown, Kentucky, and set up a law office in town. He married Mary Harrison and moved to Louisville, Kentucky, in 1832. There, he became assistant editor of the Louisville Public Advertiser and the Commonwealth's Attorney from 1833 to 1835. Holt moved to Port Gibson, Mississippi, and practiced law there as well as in Natchez, Mississippi and Vicksburg, Mississippi. Holt and his wife contracted tuberculosis. Mary died of it, and Joseph returned to Louisville to recuperate.

Buchanan administration

Following Mary's death, Holt remarried, to Margaret Wickliffe. In 1857, Holt was appointed Commissioner of Patents by President Buchanan and moved to Washington D.C. He served until 1859 when Buchanan appointed him Postmaster General. The Buchanan administration was shaken in December 1860 and January 1861, when the Confederacy was formed and many cabinet members resigned, but Holt was both against slavery and strongly for the Union. Supported by his close ally Attorney General Edwin M. Stanton, he was appointed Secretary of War upon the resignation of John B. Floyd of Virginia, who joined the Confederacy.  Stanton and Holt convinced President Buchanan he had to speak out against secession as an illegal act. Buchanan did so, but he also thought he had no power whatever to stop the secession. When Lincoln took office, Holt returned to Kentucky and worked successfully to keep the state out of the Confederacy. Kentucky was virtually neutral until Confederate units invaded in 1862, and the Unionist element took control.

Judge Advocate General
Holt joined the Army as a colonel in 1862 and was appointed by President Abraham Lincoln to be the Judge Advocate General of the Union Army.  As Judge Advocate General of the Army, Holt oversaw the expansion of military law to include the military prosecutions of citizens who were not in the military service.  He crafted the argument to the Supreme Court in Ex Parte Vallandigham,  By the time he joined the Army, he believed that the only means to prevent treason from occurring again was to ensure that slavery was abolished for all time, and eventually equal treatment under the law enforced in the South.

In 1864, he was promoted to brigadier general. He was the first Judge Advocate General to hold a general's rank. He personally prosecuted the court-martial against Major General Fitz John Porter for crimes of disobedience of a lawful order and misbehavior in front of the enemy. Lincoln also offered Holt the position of Secretary of the Interior that same year and Attorney General later in 1864, but Holt declined both offices.

He was one of the many politicians considered for the Republican Vice Presidential nomination in 1864. It went to Andrew Johnson, and Lincoln was re-elected.

According to University of New Mexico, School of Law Professor Joshua E. Kastenberg, Holt engaged in political activities that were important for the Union's war efforts, but would not be constitutionally permissible today.  For instance, Holt crafted legislation that stripped Union Army deserters of their citizenship.  The Supreme Court overturned this legislation in Tropp v. Dulles in 1958.  Holt's reasoning for this law was that Copperheads and other pro-slavery southern sympathizers encouraged desertions.  Holt also used the Army's power to suppress newspapers as well as oversee the arrest and trial of Congressman Benjamin Gwinn Harris of Maryland who "uttered treasonous statements" in the House of Representatives.

Abraham Lincoln assassination

On April 14, 1865, Lincoln was assassinated by Confederate sympathizer John Wilkes Booth. Booth's accomplice, Lewis Powell seriously injured Secretary of State Seward, and Vice President Johnson was also targeted. Holt prepared an order for the signature of Johnson for the arrest of Confederate President Jefferson Davis and five other suspects. Booth was caught on April 26, 1865, but killed by Boston Corbett, a soldier who violated orders.

As Judge Advocate General of the Army, Holt was the chief prosecutor in the trial of the accused conspirators before a military commission chaired by General David Hunter. Two assistant judge advocates, John Bingham and General Henry Lawrence Burnett assisted Holt. The defendants were George Atzerodt, David Herold, Lewis Powell, Samuel Arnold, Michael O'Laughlen, Edman Spangler, Samuel Mudd, and Mary Surratt. The trial began on May 10, 1865, and lasted two months. Holt and Bingham attempted to obscure the fact that there were two plots. The first plot was to kidnap Lincoln and exchange him for Confederate prisoners held by the Union. The second was to assassinate Lincoln, Johnson, and Seward and so throw the government into chaos.

On June 29, 1865, the eight were found guilty of conspiracy to kill the President. Arnold, O'Laughlen, and Mudd were sentenced to life in prison, Spangler to six years in prison, and Atzerodt, Herold, Powell, and Surratt to be hanged, the first woman ever to be  executed by the US federal government. They were executed July 7, 1865.
 
Holt's public image was besmirched by the trial and his prosecution of it, and many historians believe that the controversy surrounding it ended Holt's political career. In 1866, Holt issued a pamphlet, titled Vindication of Judge Advocate General Holt From the Foul Slanders of Traitors, Confessed Perjurers and Suborners, Acting in the Interest of Jefferson Davis, in which he attempted to defend himself against the various allegations and clear up some of the confusion stemming from the trial.

Later life
Holt served as Judge Advocate General until he retired on December 1, 1875. He had a quiet retirement and died in Washington on August 1, 1894. He is buried in the Holt Family Cemetery in Addison, Kentucky. Holt County, Nebraska, is named after him, as is the hamlet of Holtsville, New York and the town of Holt, Michigan.

See also

Camp Joe Holt
List of American Civil War generals (Union)

References

Further reading
 
 Coulter, E. Merton. The Civil War and Readjustment in Kentucky (1926) pp 81–110.
 Koerting, Gayla.  "For Law and Order: Joseph Holt, the Civil War, and the Judge Advocate General's Department." Register of the Kentucky Historical Society 97.1 (1999): 1-25.   Online
 Leonard, Elizabeth D. Lincoln’s Forgotten Ally: Judge Advocate General Joseph Holt of Kentucky (U of North Carolina Press, 2011) Online
 Leonard, Elizabeth D. "One Kentuckian's Hard Choice: Joseph Holt and Abraham Lincoln," Register of the Kentucky Historical Society, 106 (Summer-Autumn 2008), 373-407. Online
 Kastenberg, Joshua E. Law in War, Law as War: Brigadier General Joseph Holt and the Judge Advocate General’s Department in the Civil War and Early Reconstruction, 1861-1865 (Durham, NC: Carolina Academic Press, 2011)

Primary sources
 Holt, Joseph, and Joshua Fry Speed. The Fallacy of Neutrality: An Address by the Hon. Joseph Holt, to the People of Kentucky, Delivered at Louisville, July 13th, 1861, Also His Letter to JF Speed, Esq. (1861)  Online.

External links
 
 Joseph Holt at Mr. Lincoln's White House
 muddresearch.com

1807 births
1894 deaths
Union Army generals
United States Postmasters General
United States Secretaries of War
Judge Advocates General of the United States Army
Kentucky Commonwealth's Attorneys
Centre College alumni
People of Kentucky in the American Civil War
People of Washington, D.C., in the American Civil War
Union (American Civil War) political leaders
People from Breckinridge County, Kentucky
Politicians from Louisville, Kentucky
Kentucky lawyers
Mississippi lawyers
American prosecutors
Kentucky Republicans
United States Commissioners of Patents
Buchanan administration cabinet members
19th-century American politicians
Southern Unionists in the American Civil War
People associated with the assassination of Abraham Lincoln